Luca Bindi (born 1971) is an Italian geologist. He holds the Chair of Mineralogy and Crystallography and is the Head of the Department of Earth Sciences of the University of Florence. He is also a research associate at the Istituto di Geoscienze e Georisorse of the National Research Council (Italy) (CNR). He has received national and international scientific awards that include the President of the Republic Prize 2015 in the category of Physical, Mathematical and Natural Sciences. Since 2019 is a Member of the National Academy of Lincei.

Bindi is credited with the co-discovery of the first known natural quasicrystal, having identified a potential candidate from the mineral collection at the "Università di Firenze".  The discovery ultimately showed that quasicrystals can form spontaneously in nature and remain stable for geological times.

Recognition 
Awards for his research, include:
 Panichi Prize for mineralogical investigations of the Italian Society of Mineralogy and Petrology (2004) 
 Nardelli Prize awarded by the Italian Association of Crystallography (2006) 
 Excellence Research Medal awarded by the European Mineralogical Union 
 Foreign Outstanding Young Researcher Award from the Russian Mineralogical Society (2007) 
 Luigi Tartufari Prize for Geology of the Accademia Nazionale dei Lincei (2010) 
 Award given by the President of the Republic (2015) 
 Aspen Institute Italia Award with Paul J. Steinhardt for scientific research and collaboration between Italy and the United States (2018)

Two of his scientific works related to the discovery of the first natural quasicrystal, icosahedrite, were cited in Scientific Background on the Nobel Prize in Chemistry 2011 – The Discovery of Quasicrystals of the Nobel Committee for Chemistry of the Royal Swedish Academy of Sciences. On 29 May 2018, the asteroid 92279 Bindiluca was named in his honor.

Research 
Bindi has numerous international collaborations, especially with Princeton University, Harvard University, and the California Institute of Technology.

His research activity, condensed in more than 300 scientific publications, has been devoted to four different areas:

a) mantle mineralogy (clinopyroxenes, garnets, akimotoite, bridgmanite, hiroseite, ahrensite, wadsleyite, post-spinel phases, dense hydrous magnesium silicates);

b) aperiodic structures in the mineral kingdom (melilite, fresnoite, calaverite, natrite, muthmannite, pearceite-polybasite, icosahedrite, decagonite);

c) superstructures, twinning, OD-phenomena and structural complexity in minerals (melilites, pearceite, polybasite, samsonite, calaverite, empressite, fettelite, quadratite, sinnerite, sartorite, meneghinite, zinkenite);

d) structure solution of unknown structures and description of new mineral species (about 250 crystal structures solved and ~100 new mineral species described)

Significant among his research works are the crystal-chemical studies of major mineral phases for the Earth's mantle, and studies of potassium-rich clinopyroxene, which had broad international resonance. He is also very well known for his studies on the complexity of mineral structures integrating mineralogy with the most-advanced fields of crystallography.

Controversies 

In July 2020, on the basis of an anonymous report, the Florence edition of national newspaper La Repubblica wrote that Professor Bindi took up portions of the text of his program as candidate for the position of Head of the Department of Earth Sciences of the University of Florence.  
La Repubblica reports that Professor Bindi said that it was only a provisional, unofficial document, which would have been discussed with all the members of the department in case he was elected. Further, Bindi commented that he had carefully read many election programs of candidates for the position of Director of the Department, precisely to learn and be stimulated by the initiatives planned for other departments so as to find ideas to be taken up and possibly improved in his department. On July 27, 2020, Bindi has been elected as Head of the Department of Earth Sciences of the University of Florence with 97% of the votes.

References

1971 births
Living people
21st-century Italian geologists
Italian mineralogists
Academic staff of the University of Florence